Action Earth is an Australian environmental series that airs on The Weather Channel and FOX8 on the hour, every hour. It is narrated by Olympic medallist Ian Thorpe.

Action Earth was produced as a 20-part series, with each episode 5 minutes long. Each episode focuses on a different environmental aspect, and aims to educate the public on how to improve our planet.

Fox8 original programming
2007 Australian television series debuts